The Diocese of Ardagh and Clonmacnoise is a Roman Catholic diocese in Ireland.

Geography
The diocese is entirely within the Republic of Ireland and contains most of counties Longford and Leitrim, with parts of counties Cavan, Offaly, Roscommon, Sligo and Westmeath. The main towns in the diocese are Athlone, Ballymahon, Carrick-on-Shannon, Edgeworthstown, Granard and Longford.

Ecclesiastical history

Lordship and Kingdom of Ireland
The union of the sees of Ardagh and Clonmacnoise, which had been proposed in 1709, was carried into effect following the death of Stephen MacEgan, Bishop of Meath on 30 May 1756, who had been administering the see of Clonmacnoise. Augustine Cheevers, Bishop of Ardagh, was translated to the see of Meath on 7 August 1756, and Anthony Blake was appointed as the first bishop of united see of Ardagh and Clonmacnoise on 11 August 1756.

Modern times
On Christmas Day 2009, St Mel's cathedral in Longford was destroyed by fire. Bishop O'Reilly said that the building is "just a shell" and "burned out from end to end". The bishop said construction on the cathedral began in 1840 and he described it as a flagship Cathedrals of the midlands. After a long investigation the cause of the fire was traced back to a brick lined chimney at the rear of the cathedral

Bishop of Ardagh and Clonmacnoise 

On 17 July 2013, Pope Francis accepted the resignation of the Most Reverend Colm O'Reilly from the pastoral government of the Diocese of Ardagh and Clonmacnoise, in accordance with Canon 401 §1 of the Latin Church 1983 Code of Canon Law. 

On the same day, Francis Duffy was appointed the Bishop of Ardagh and Clonmacnoise by Pope Francis and received episcopal consecration from Cardinal Seán Brady, Archbishop of Armagh on 6 October 2013.

List of parishes
The following are the current parishes in the diocese (official names in italics where they differ from the currently-used names)

 Abbeylara (County Longford)
 Aghavas (County Leitrim)
 Annaduff (County Leitrim)
 Ardagh and Moydow (County Longford)
 Athlone (St. Mary's) (County Westmeath)
 Ballinahown, Boher and Pullagh (Lemanaghan) (County Offaly and County Westmeath)
 Ballinalee (Clonbroney) (County Longford)
 Ballymachugh (Ballymachugh and Drumlumman South) (County Cavan)
 Ballymahon (Shrule) (County Longford)
 Bornacoola (County Leitrim and County Longford)
 Carrickedmond and Abbeyshrule (Taghshinny, Taghshinod and Abbeyshrule) (County Longford)
 Cashel (County Longford)
 Carrick-on-Shannon (Kiltoghert) (County Leitrim)
 Cloghan and Banagher (Gallen and Rynagh) (County Offaly)
 Clonguish (County Longford)
 Cloone (County Leitrim)
 Colmcille (Columbkille) (County Longford)
 Dromard (County Longford)
 Drumlish (County Longford)
 Drumshanbo (Murhaun) (County Leitrim)
 Fenagh (County Leitrim)
 Ferbane (Wheery and Tisaran) (County Offaly)
 Gortletteragh (County Leitrim)
 Granard (County Longford)
 Keadue, Arigna and Ballyfarnon (Kilronan) (County Roscommon)
 Kenagh (Kilcommock) (County Longford)
 Killashee (Killashee and Clondra) (County Longford)
 Killenummery and Ballintogher (Killanummery and Killery) (County Leitrim and County Sligo)
 Killoe (County Longford)
 Kiltubrid (County Leitrim)
 Legan and Ballycloghan (Kilglass, Rathreagh and Agharra) (County Longford)
 Longford (Templemichael and Ballymacormack) (County Longford)
 Lough Gowna and Mullinalaghta (Scrabby and Columbkille East) (County Cavan and County Longford)
 Moate and Mount Temple (Calry, Ballyloughloe and Kilcleagh) (County Westmeath)
 Mohill (Mohill Manacháin) (County Leitrim)
 Mostrim (County Longford)
 Mullahoran (Drumlumman North and Loughduff) (County Cavan)
 Rathcline (County Longford)
 Rathowen (Rathaspic and Russagh) (County Westmeath)
 Shannonbridge (Clonmacnois) (County Offaly)
 Streete (County Longford and County Westmeath)

See also
 Catholic Church in Ireland
 Diocese of Kilmore, Elphin and Ardagh (Church of Ireland)

References

Bibliography

Further reading
 Devaney, Rev. Owen, Ardagh and Clonmacnois: Footsteps of Mel and Ciarán, Booklink, 2005.

External links
 Official Diocesan website
 Map of parishes in diocese
 Longford Parish (Templemichael & Ballymacormack) and St Mel's Cathedral
 Diocese of Ardagh and Clonmacnoise
 Catholic Hierarchy
 

 
Roman Catholic dioceses in Ireland
Dioceses established in the 18th century
1756 establishments in Ireland
Religion in County Cavan
Religion in County Leitrim
Religion in County Longford
Religion in County Offaly
Religion in County Roscommon
Religion in County Sligo
Religion in County Westmeath
Roman Catholic Ecclesiastical Province of Armagh